Walter Maponyane (born 27 November 1987 in Malamulele) is a South African football (soccer) player for Premier Soccer League clubs.

Maponyane was previously known as Choppa Mboweni. He played under the identity of Choppa Mboweni for the South Africa Under-20 national 2009 and 2010, it was later found that he was over-age. He was previously considered to have been 20 years of age in 2011 under the guise of Mboweni.

He spent the 2012–13 season on loan at National First Division side United FC.

References 

1987 births
Living people
Sportspeople from Limpopo
People from Collins Chabane Local Municipality
Association football defenders
South African soccer players
Bidvest Wits F.C. players
Mamelodi Sundowns F.C. players
Chippa United F.C. players
Polokwane City F.C. players
M Tigers F.C. players